Franco Scaramelli (born October 8, 1911 in Modena) was an Italian professional football player. He played for 10 seasons (163 games, 27 goals) in the Serie A for Modena F.C. and A.S. Roma.

External links
 

1911 births
Year of death missing
Italian footballers
Serie A players
Modena F.C. players
A.S. Roma players
Brescia Calcio players
Association football midfielders